The Nateshwori Temple (Nepali: नाटेश्वरी मन्दिर) is a Hindu temple of Devi Vagawoti located in the far-west region of Nepal Seti Zone  Bajura Kailashmandu-03. This temple is one of the sacred temples of Hindu faith.

Description
The temple considered as the open-air dancing theatre of Lord Shiva-Parvati, also pronounced locally as नाचन्थली ( नाच:Dance  थली: Theater ). This "extensive Hindu temple build in Pagoda style is worshiped mainly for Devi Vagawoti, Dhalpura Devi and Kalika Devi.

The major festivals of the temple are Janai Purnima and Chaite Dashain on the very day devotees form all over Nepal and also from India come to visit.

Though situated on the lap of Badimalika, this temple (नाटेश्वरी) is considered as the belongings (elder sister) of Malika Devi. Rituals of Nateshwori are carried out by two sets of priests; one being the Thakuri priests and other the Bhramin Joshi . Shahi Thakuri of Khirpata and Joshi Bhramin of Belkatte are the ones who performs the ritual and can touch the deity.This temple is opened only during big festivals and on other few special days, the daily rituals of the temple are performed in the Bhandarghar (भण्डारघर) in Thakurbada (ठकुरवाडा) by Shahi Thakuri priests.

References

Hindu temples in Sudurpashchim Province
Historical Hindu kingdoms
Buildings and structures in Bajura District